Hu Ruibao (born 17 October 1996) is a Chinese footballer who currently plays for Chengdu Rongcheng in the Chinese Super League.

Club career
Hu Ruibao joined Shanghai Luckystar football academy in 2008 and transferred to Chinese Super League side Guangzhou Evergrande in December 2013. On 2 April 2015, he received a ban of three months by the Chinese Football Association for age falsification which he used a fake ID Hu Bao (born 5 January 1998) to register in the youth league between 2008 and 2014. Hu was promoted to Guangzhou Evergrande's first team squad by Luiz Felipe Scolari in the summer of 2016. He played as an unused substitute for five times in the 2016 season.

In November 2016, Hu received trial with Premier League side Manchester City. Guangzhou Evergrande refused Hu moving aboard and declared that he was under contract with the club, while Hu and his agent retorted that Guangzhou must let Hu join European Top-5 League clubs free according to the contract. Hu claimed that his trial at Manchester City was successful, he would strive for a regular starter of Manchester City in five years. Hu joined Danish club Vejle Boldklub in February 2017. Guangzhou submitted a claim to FIFA Dispute Resolution Chamber (DRC) for the ownership of Hu Ruibao on 27 February 2017. Hu received an interim transfer certificate to join Vejle Boldklub in March 2017.

Hu was loaned to 2. Bundesliga side Darmstadt 98, who newly relegated from Bundesliga, for one season on 7 August 2017. Without playing any competitive match for the club, he was linked with Chinese Super League club Tianjin TEDA in December 2017. On 3 January 2018, Darmstadt 98 officially terminated his loan deal in advance.

Hu returned to Guangzhou Evergrande in January 2018. On 2 March 2018, he made his senior debut in a 5–4 home defeat against city rival Guangzhou R&F, coming on as a substitute for Deng Hanwen in the half time. To gain more playing time he would go on to be loaned out to fellow top tier club Henan Jianye on 8 July 2019. He would go on to make his debut for them in a league game on 16 July 2019 against Shanghai Shenhua in a 3-2 defeat. On his return to Guangzhou he would struggle to establish himself within the team and after being dropped to the reserves he was allowed to join top tier club Guangzhou City on 14 March 2021 on a one year contract.  

On 26 April 2022, Hu joined newly promoted club Chengdu Rongcheng for the start of the 2022 Chinese Super League season. He would go on to make his debut in a league game on 8 June 2022 against Beijing Guoan in a 3-2 defeat. This was followed by his first goal, which was in a league game on 26 June 2022 against Shenzhen in a 2-2 draw.

Career statistics
.

Honours

Club
Guangzhou Evergrande
Chinese Super League: 2016, 2019
Chinese FA Cup: 2016
Chinese FA Super Cup: 2018

References

External links

1996 births
Living people
Chinese footballers
People from Heze
Footballers from Shandong
Guangzhou F.C. players
Vejle Boldklub players
SV Darmstadt 98 players
Henan Songshan Longmen F.C. players
Chinese Super League players
Chinese expatriate footballers
Expatriate men's footballers in Denmark
Expatriate footballers in Germany
Association football defenders